Hossein Fereydoun (born in 1957) is an Iranian politician. Fereydoun is brother and aide to the President Hassan Rouhani, described as his “eyes and ears” in the negotiations leading to the Joint Comprehensive Plan of Action.

Early life and education
Born in 1957 in Sorkheh, Fereydoun had a PhD in International relations from the Shahid Beheshti University.

Career

He was responsible for the Ayatollah Khomeini's security when he returned to Iran in 1979. He served as the district governor of Karaj and Nishapur. Fereydoun was later appointed as Iran's ambassador to Malaysia and held the office for eight years, before joining Iran's delegation to the United Nations.

Fereydoun is associated with the Moderation and Development Party.

Corruption case
On 15 July 2017, Fereydoun was arrested for questioning in connection with a corruption probe. He was released 2 days later and reported to pay as much as 500 billion rials (US$15.3 million) for his release. In 2019, he was sentenced to five years in prison.

References 

1957 births
Living people
People from Semnan, Iran
People from Sorkheh, Semnan, Iran
People from Semnan Province
Iranian diplomats
Ambassadors of Iran to Malaysia
Iranian nuclear negotiators
Deputies of the Ministry of Intelligence (Iran)
Presidential aides of Iran
Moderation and Development Party politicians
Shahid Beheshti University alumni